Berit Björk (born 19 June 1963) is a Swedish former professional tennis player.

Björk, who comes from Sala, Sweden, was the national outdoor champion in 1981. On the professional circuit she made appearances at WTA Tour level and featured in qualifying for the French Open. She played collegiate tennis in the United States at the University of Arkansas-Little Rock, where she also competed on the soccer team for one season, scoring 13 goals and recording 2 assists. As a varsity tennis player she won three successive NAIA singles championships from 1984 to 1986.

References

External links
 
 

1963 births
Living people
Swedish female tennis players
College women's tennis players in the United States
People from Sala Municipality
Swedish women's footballers
Women's association football forwards
Little Rock Trojans women's soccer players
Swedish expatriate footballers
Swedish expatriate sportspeople in the United States
Expatriate women's soccer players in the United States
Sportspeople from Västmanland County
20th-century Swedish women
21st-century Swedish women